Małgorzata Barbara Sadurska (born 3 December 1975 in Puławy) is a Polish politician. She was elected to the Sejm on 25 September 2005, receiving 6,988 votes in 6 Lublin district, as a candidate from the Law and Justice list.

It was noted in 2021 that since she stopped being an MP her wages are much higher (25x) than the average wage.

See also
Members of Polish Sejm 2005-2007

References

External links
Małgorzata Sadurska - parliamentary page - includes declarations of interest, voting record, and transcripts of speeches.

1975 births
Living people
People from Puławy
Law and Justice politicians
Members of the Polish Sejm 2005–2007
Members of the Polish Sejm 2007–2011
Members of the Polish Sejm 2011–2015
Women members of the Sejm of the Republic of Poland
21st-century Polish women politicians